, also known as , is a Shinto shrine located in Sakurai, Nara Prefecture, Japan. The shrine is noted because it contains no sacred images or objects because it is believed to serve Mount Miwa, the mountain on which it stands. In this sense, it is a model of what the first Shinto shrines were like. Ōmiwa Shrine is one of the oldest extant Shinto shrines in Japan and the site has been sacred ground for some of the earliest religious practices in Japan. Because of this, it has sometimes been named as Japan's first shrine. Ōmiwa Shrine is a tutelary shrine of the Japanese sake brewers.

History
Ōmiwa Shrine's history is closely related to Mount Miwa and the religious practices surrounding the mountain. In the early Kofun period, Yamato kings and leaders had shifted their attention to kami worship on Mount Miwa, and Ōmiwa Shrine was the major institution for this branch of worship. The style of Shinto surrounding Miwa became later known as Miwa Shinto, and is set apart from previous practices by a more structured theological philosophy.

The shrine became the object of Imperial patronage during the early Heian period. In 965, Emperor Murakami ordered that Imperial messengers be sent to report important events to the guardian kami of Japan. These heihaku were initially presented to 16 shrines, including Ōmiwa.

Ōmiwa was designated as the chief Shinto shrine (ichinomiya) for the former Yamato Province.

Religious significance

The Ōmiwa Shrine is directly linked to Mount Miwa in that the mountain is the shrine's shintai, or "kami-body", instead of a building housing a "kami-body". This type of mountain worship (shintai-zan) is found in the earliest forms of Shinto, and has also been employed at Suwa Shrine in Nagano, and formerly at Isonokami Shrine in Nara and Munakata Shrine in Fukuoka.

According to the chronicle Nihon Shoki, Emperor Sujin appealed to Mount Miwa's kami when Japan was crippled by plague. In response, the kami Ōmononushi demanded rituals be performed for him at Mount Miwa. He then demanded that the rites be led by Ōtata Neko, his half-kami, half-human son born from the union with a woman of the Miwa clan. Ōta Taneko performed the rites to satisfaction, and the plague subsided. A building dedicated to Ōta Taneko was later erected in his honor.

A legendary white snake is said to live in around the shrine, and is supposedly one of the kami worshiped there. Indeed, snakes and the snake cult figures importantly in the myths surrounding Mount Miwa as well as early Shinto in general.

Auxiliary shrines

The Ōmiwa shrine complex includes notable auxiliary shrines (setsumatsusha), including 12  and 28  which are marked by small structures falling under Ōmiwa's jurisdiction. For example, the sessha Ikuhi jinja enshrines the kami who was appointed Ōmiwa's sake brewer in the 4th month of the 8th year of the reign of Emperor Sujin. A poem associated with Ikuhi is said to have been composed by Empress Jingū on the occasion of a banquet for her son, Emperor Ōjin:
This is sacred sake
is not my sacred sake.
This sacred sake brewed by Ōmononushi
How long ago
How long ago.

Architecture

Ōmiwa Shrine is situated in a quiet forest, and built directly in front of Mount Miwa. An ancient Japanese cedar tree (Cryptomeria) can be found on shrine compound, and is considered sacred.  The mountain itself serves as the honden, or main hall, instead of a man-made building.

Decorations in the form of Borromean rings are found throughout the shrine's buildings.

Built in 1984, at 32 m the torii on its sandō is the second highest in Japan. The shrine also has a great shime torii, an ancient form of gate made only with two posts and a rope called shimenawa. It is one of few shrines that has a "triple-torii" (miwa torii) on its grounds. This gate is also one of the few to actually have doors, which bar access to the mountain it enshrines.

The buildings at Ōmiwa Shrine are a mix of structures built from ancient times to the Edo period.

National treasures

Important Cultural Assets
The entire shrine compound
The 17th century haiden, or prayer hall, built with cypress bark roofing
The "Triple-torii" (miwa torii)
The shinden dedicated to Ōtata Neko
Suit of bronze armor, lacquered red
A copy of the Book of Zhou, scroll number 19

See also 

 Asteroid 24640 Omiwa
 Koshintō
 List of Shinto shrines
 Modern system of ranked Shinto Shrines
 Mount Miwa
 Twenty-Two Shrines
 Miwa clan

Notes

References

 Aston, William George. (2005). Nihongi: Chronicles of Japan from the Earliest Times to A.D. 697.  Boston: Tuttle Publishing. .
 Breen, John and Mark Teeuwen. (2000).  Shinto in History: Ways of the Kami. Honolulu: University of Hawaii Press. 
 Brown, Delmer M. (1993). Cambridge History of Japan, Volume 1.  New York: Cambridge University Press. .
 Kidder, Jonathan Edward (2007). Himiko and Japan's elusive chiefdom of Yamatai: archaeology, history, and mythology.  Honolulu: University of Hawaii Press. .
 Ponsonby-Fane, Richard. (1962).   Studies in Shinto and Shrines. Kyoto: Ponsonby Memorial Society. OCLC 399449
 . (1959).  The Imperial House of Japan. Kyoto: Ponsonby Memorial Society. OCLC 194887
 . (1964).  Visiting Famous Shrines in Japan. Kyoto: Ponsonby-Fane Memorial Society.

External links

Official Site (Japanese)
Official Site (English)

Shinto shrines in Nara Prefecture
Important Cultural Properties of Japan
Historic Sites of Japan
Beppyo shrines
Kanpei-taisha